Valanjanganam falls, locally known as Valanjanganam Vellachaattam is a scenic waterfall located in Kuttikkanam in Idukki district, Kerala state. It lies on the Kottayam-Kumily state highway, about 1 km from Murinjapuzha and 5 km from Kuttikkanam. Its a best place to relax in the misty climate after long drive. Tourists usually stop here for a tea and enjoy the falls. Its an ideal spot to stop and take a quick stretch and relax during tiring journeys.

See also
 Kuttikkanam
 Peermade

References

Waterfalls of Kerala
Geography of Idukki district
Kuttikkanam